Saluda is a census-designated place (CDP) in and the county seat of Middlesex County, Virginia, United States. The population as of the 2010 Census was 769.

The Middlesex County Courthouse was built between 1850 and 1874 by architects William R. Jones and John P. Hill, and is listed in the National Register of Historic Places. A new courthouse complex was built in the 2003–2004 time-frame, but the opening was stalled due to various construction problems, leading to a legal dispute between the County board and the contractor. It was eventually opened in 2007.

An older notable building is the Christ Church. The highly decorated Marine, veteran of the Banana Wars, World War II, and the Korean War, Lieutenant General Lewis Burwell "Chesty" Puller was raised in Saluda. He died in Hampton, Virginia in 1971, and was buried in historic Christ Church's Cemetery near Saluda.

References

Census-designated places in Middlesex County, Virginia
County seats in Virginia
Unincorporated communities in Virginia
Census-designated places in Virginia